Maxi (released as Maxi Priest in the United States and Canada) is the third studio album by English reggae vocalist Maxi Priest, released in 1987. It contains the singles "Some Guys Have All the Luck", "How Can We Ease the Pain?", "Wild World" and "Goodbye to Love Again".

Track listing

International version (Maxi)

US and Canada version (Maxi Priest)

Charts and certifications

Weekly charts
Maxi

Maxi Priest

Certifications

References

External links
Maxi at Discogs
Maxi Priest at Discogs

1987 albums
Maxi Priest albums
Albums produced by Sly and Robbie